Sher Shah Bridge is an overpass in Karachi, Pakistan. In September 2007, the bridge collapsed, leaving five men crushed as a result.

Sher Shah neighbourhood and Sher Shah Bridge in Kiamari Town of Karachi and Sher Shah Park in Wah Cantt, Pakistan, are named in the honour of Sher Shah Suri.

Collapse case
Court took charges against the officials of National Highway Authority.

References

Bridges in Karachi